Arme Construction Company has been one of Iran's and the Middle East's largest construction companies.

The company has built numerous civic and infrastructure projects including roads, bridges, tunnels, airports, whole townships, and an entire  Asian Games Sports Complex in Tehran, including the 105,000 seat Azadi Stadium, indoor Olympic Swimming Pool, Velodrome, Olympic Village and a giant man-made lake, all designed by Skidmore, Owings & Merrill of Chicago and Abdol-Aziz Farmanfarmaian and Associates Architects, and all built with a future Tehran Olympic Games in mind.

Arme and its subsidiaries and affiliates including Parc des Princes Co, Vanak Park Co, Kamsaz Co, Paziran Co, were also responsible for building some of the Middle East's largest private real estate development projects including the 200,000 sq. metre Parc des Princes and Vanak Park high rise communities and various office buildings in Tehran, including the Paziran, Pan American Oil Co and Iranian National Railways office buildings.

History

Arme was founded in 1946 by Iranian entrepreneur Amir Malekyazdi.

Projects

The Azadi Sport Complex (formerly Aryamehr Sport Complex).
Kan Bridge 1974.
Vanak Parkway Overpass 1973.
Bridges over Karaj Freeway 1971.
Khoy-Rezaieh Road Lots 4,5 and 6 1974.
Bandar Abbas-Rudan Road Lot 40, 1966
Shiraz Bushehr road Lot 6/C 1974.
Shiraz Bushehr road Lot 2, 1968.
Third bridge over the Karoun river 1969.
Fourth bridge over the Karoun river 1973.
Hafez- Soraya Building 1974
University of Tehran main entrance 1971
Farahanz Noursing School 1974.

Buildings
Rezaieh Tobacco Factory warehouses and associated
buildings, Rezaieh, 1948.
Bank Sepah headquarters building 1972
Shahi Weaving Factory including threading factory, jute manufacturing plant and knitting and weaving mill, Shahi, 1952.
Sheetsazi Building and Power Plant, Tehran, 1954.
Tehran Maternity Hospital, Tehran, 1958.
Government Buildings, Tehran, 1958.
Imperial Iranian Air Force Buildings, Hamadan and Dezful Air Bases, 1971.
Tehran University Entrance Gates, Tehran, 1971.
National Iranian Steel Mill Training School, Isfahan, 1971
Sepah Bank headquarters and office building, Tehran, 1972.
Aryamehr Stadium for 100,000 spectators, Tehran, 1972.
Hafez-Soraya office building, Tehran, 1973.

Bridges
Bandar Abbas-Rudan Road, Bridge, 1967.
Third Bridge over the Karoun River, on Khorramshahr Andimeshk-Ahwaz-Sar-Bandar feeder road, 1971
Vanak Parkway Overpass, Tehran, 1971.
Fourth Bridge over the Karoun River, Ahwaz, 1973.
Bridges on the Shiraz-Bushehr Road, Lot 2,1968 and Lot 6/C. 1973 
Bridge on Khoy-Rezaieh Road.

Roads 
Hamadan-Khosrovi Highway, lots 2 and 5, 1961.
Shahi-Babol Highway, 1963.
Bandar Abbas-Rudan Main Road, 1966.
Yasuj-Fahlian Feeder Road, 1968.
Yasuj-Sisakht Feeder Road, 1970.
Khorramabad-Afrineh (Zagheh-Andimeshk) Main Road, 1965 .
Gutchan-Shahpassand Highway, lot I, 1971.
Tomb of Reza Shah the Great Connecting Road, Tehran, 1971.
Khorramshahr-Andimeshk, Ahwaz-Sar Bandar Connecting Road and Karoun river Bridge, 1971.
Shiraz-Bushehr Highway, lot 2, 1968.
Shiraz-Bushehr Highway, lot 6/C. 
Rezaieh-Khoy Highway, lots 4,5 and 6.

Other Projects 
Water canals along the Karaj River, 1960.
Procurement of 1,300,000 cubic meters of concrete aggregate for the National Iranian Steel Mill, Isfahan, 1970.
Site preparation of three sites for the National Iranian Steel Mill, Isfahan, 1970.
Re-surfacing of Hamadan and Dezful Airfields for the Imperial Iranian Air Force, 1971.
Relocation of pipelines for the National Iranian Oil Company, Avaj-Andimeshk, 1965
Irrigation canals and works for Dez Irrigation Project, Dezful, 1973.
Street paving for the cities of Tehran, Sabol, Malayer, Nain and Mehrabad.

References

Construction and civil engineering companies of Iran
Construction and civil engineering companies  established in 1946
Iranian companies established in 1946